Özge Özacar (born 20 November 1993) is a Turkish actress.

Early life and education
Özge Özacar was born on 20 November 1993 in Istanbul, Turkey. She graduated from Marmara University, in the department of journalism. She acquired her acting training from Istanbul Centre, she obtained training from Zeynep Günay Tan. The actress is fluent in English and French.

Career
Özacar started her acting career in 2015, she acted in the series Tatlı Küçük Yalancılar and portrayed the character of Müge. In 2016, she made her debut in the series Oyunbozan and depicted the character of Zeynep. In 2017, she made her debut in the series Lise Devriyesi and depicted the character of Meltem. The show starred Mehmet Ozan Dolunay and Bahar Şahin. In the same year, she had a main role in the series Meryem and portrayed the character of Naz. In 2019, she made first cinematic debut in the movie Hababam Sınıfı Yeniden and depicted the character of Didem. In the same year, she had a leading role in the series Sevgili Geçmiş and depicted the character of Azra, who earned money by entertaining people in the bar and grew up in a dormitory. In 2020, she made her debut in the series Kerafet and portrays the character of Meltem Serez, the show stars Mert Fırat and Nurgül Yeşilçay.

Personal life
Özacar was rumoured to be dating Turkish actor Furkan Andıç when the kissing photo of two of them went viral, however Andıç stated they were just friends.

Filmography

References

External links
 
 

Living people
1993 births
Turkish television actresses
21st-century Turkish actresses
Turkish film actresses
Actresses from Istanbul
Marmara University alumni